"...E dimmi che non vuoi morire" (Italian for "...And Tell Me You Don't Want to Die") is a 1997 song performed by Italian singer Patty Pravo. It was composed by Roberto Ferri and Gaetano Curreri, with lyrics written by Vasco Rossi.

Pravo performed the track at the 47th Sanremo Music Festival in February 1997 where it took the 8th place and won the critics' award. It was released as a single with live version of "Qui e là" and included on the live album Bye Bye Patty issued the same month. "...E dimmi che non vuoi morire" changed the fortunes of Patty's long-declining career and was her first top 5 chart hit in Italy in almost 20 years.

Track listing
CD single
 "...E dimmi che non vuoi morire"
 "Qui e là"

Charts

Weekly charts

Year-end charts

References

1997 singles
1997 songs
Italian songs
Patty Pravo songs
Sanremo Music Festival songs
Songs written by Vasco Rossi